Jairo Manuel Asencio (born May 30, 1983) is a professional baseball right-handed pitcher who is a free agent. He has played for the Atlanta Braves, Cleveland Indians, Chicago Cubs, and Baltimore Orioles in MLB. He spent 2014 with the Kia Tigers of the KBO League.

Career

Pittsburgh Pirates
Asencio was first signed by the Pittsburgh Pirates in 2001.

Atlanta Braves
He was placed on the Atlanta Braves 40-man roster for the first time in 2009 when he made three appearances for the major league team, and later on April 16, 2011, to replace the disabled Peter Moylan. His Major League debut was on July 12, 2009, against the Colorado Rockies. On April 28, 2011, Asencio was optioned back to the Triple-A Gwinnett Braves.

For the entire 2010 Atlanta Braves season, Asencio was on the team's restricted list because of visa problems. It was discovered later in the year that Asencio had used a false name, Luis Valdez, and birthdate.

Cleveland Indians
On March 29, 2012, Asencio was traded to the Cleveland Indians for cash considerations. Asencio was designated for assignment on May 28, 2012.

Chicago Cubs
The Chicago Cubs claimed Asencio off waivers on June 1, 2012.

Milwaukee Brewers
Asencio signed a Minor League contract with an invitation to Spring training with the Milwaukee Brewers on Nov. 5, 2012.

Baltimore Orioles
On March 25, 2013, he was traded to the Baltimore Orioles for a player to be named later or cash. He started the 2013 season with the Triple-A Norfolk Tides. He was recalled by the Orioles on July 12, and pitched one inning of relief against the Toronto Blue Jays that night. He was designated for assignment on July 28, 2013. He elected free agency on October 4, 2013.

Kia Tigers
Asencio signed a deal with the Kia Tigers in the Korea Baseball Organization for the 2014 season.

Chicago White Sox
On January 22, 2015, he signed a minor league contract with the Chicago White Sox. He was released on May 29.

Leones de Yucatán
On April 18, 2017, Asencio signed with the Leones de Yucatán of the Mexican Baseball League. He was released on June 6, 2017.

Saraperos de Saltillo
On May 23, 2019, Asencio signed with the Saraperos de Saltillo of the Mexican League. He was released on June 4, 2019. 

On February 10, 2022, Asencio signed with the Mariachis de Guadalajara of the Mexican League. However, he was released prior to the start of the season on April 19, 2022.

References

External links

1983 births
Atlanta Braves players
Baltimore Orioles players
Baseball players at the 2020 Summer Olympics
Medalists at the 2020 Summer Olympics
Olympic medalists in baseball
Olympic bronze medalists for the Dominican Republic
Charlotte Knights players
Chicago Cubs players
Cleveland Indians players
Dominican Republic expatriate baseball players in Mexico
Dominican Republic expatriate baseball players in South Korea
Dominican Republic expatriate baseball players in the United States
Gulf Coast Pirates players
Gwinnett Braves players
Hickory Crawdads players
Iowa Cubs players
KBO League pitchers
Kia Tigers players
Leones de Yucatán players
Living people
Lynchburg Hillcats players
Major League Baseball pitchers
Major League Baseball players from the Dominican Republic
Mexican League baseball players
Mississippi Braves players
Norfolk Tides players
People from San Cristóbal Province
Saraperos de Saltillo players
Tigres del Licey players
Toros del Este players
Williamsport Crosscutters players
Olympic baseball players of the Dominican Republic